The Odet is a river in France.

Odet may also refer to:

 Odet d'Aydie (c. 1425–1490), Admiral of France
 Odet de Coligny (1517–1571), French cardinal
 Odet de Foix, Vicomte de Lautrec (1485–1528), Marshal of France
 Odet de Selve (c. 1504-1563), French diplomat
 Odet de Turnèbe (1552–1581), French author
 Odet Philippe (1787–1869), Floridian settler
 Stéphane Odet (born 1976), French footballer

See also
 Odet-Joseph Giry (1699–1761), French clergyman
 
 Odets
 Odette (disambiguation)